Ibrahima Koné (born 6 October 1977) is a Malian football player who last played for Stade Malien de Bamako.

External links
 

1977 births
Living people
Malian footballers
Malian expatriate footballers
Mali international footballers
2004 African Cup of Nations players
Expatriate footballers in Albania
Expatriate footballers in Senegal
Stade Malien players
FK Dinamo Tirana players
ASC Jeanne d'Arc players
Association football defenders
21st-century Malian people